Tuduetso Sabure (born 16 June 1982) is a Botswana chess player. She received the FIDE title of Woman Grandmaster (WGM) in 2005.

Biography
In 2005, in Lusaka won African Women's Chess Championship and won the right to participate in the Women's World Chess Championship. In 2006 Tuduetso Sabure participated in Women's World Chess Championship by knock-out system and in the first round lost to Humpy Koneru. In 2007, in Windhoek ranked 7th in African Women's Chess Championship. In 2007, she played for Botswana in All-Africa Games chess tournament, which ranked 4th in the team ranking, and World Women's Team Chess Championship. In 2017, in Cairo ranked 17th in African Women's Chess Championship.

Tuduetso Sabure played for Botswana in the Women's Chess Olympiads:
 In 1998, at third board in the 33rd Chess Olympiad (women) in Elista (+5, =0, -7),
 In 2000, at first reserve board in the 34th Chess Olympiad (women) in Istanbul (+4, =2, -2),
 In 2004, at second board in the 36th Chess Olympiad (women) in Calvià (+5, =0, -5),
 In 2010, at first board in the 39th Chess Olympiad (women) in Khanty-Mansiysk (+4, =1, -4).

References

External links
 
 
 

1982 births
Living people
Botswana female chess players
Chess woman grandmasters
Chess Olympiad competitors
Competitors at the 2007 All-Africa Games
African Games competitors for Botswana